Los Angeles de Charly is a mexican cumbia group led by vocalist Carlos Becies. The group was formed in 1999, after Charly Becies and fellow vocalists Guillermo "Memo" Palafox and Jonathan Martínez left the popular group Los Ángeles Azules and have become one of leading exporters of the romantic Mexican cumbia genre.  In 2000, the group's ten-track album Un Sueño peaked at No. 29 on the Billboard Independent Albums chart.  Their follow-up album Te Voy a Enamorar was released in 2001 and went to number-one on the Billboard Top Latin Albums chart.

Discography

Studio albums
 La Magia Del Amor (1999) 
 Un Sueño (2000)
 Te Voy a Enamorar (2001)
 Bonita Mujer (2002)
 Recuerdos (2003)
 Carta de Amor (2004)
 Cuando Te Enamoras (2005)
 Un Tiempo,Un Estilo,Un Amor 2006
 Mi eterno amor secreto 2007
 Luna Desnuda (2008) Last album On Fonovisa
Amores y recuerdos (2011 )Titanio Records
Romántico (2020) Gerencia 360

Direct albums
DVD En Vivo en el Teatro Gran Rex (2006) (Only for Sale in Argentina [Barca Records])
Grandes Éxitos En Vivo en Scombro Bailable y La Mira (2011) [Garra Records]

Compilations
 Juntos Por Primera Vez/Con Grupo Mandingo. (2002)Fonovisa
 Encuentro De Angeles Volumen 01/Con Los Angeles Azules. (2003)Disa/Fonovisa
 De Recuerdos y Amores 20 Grandes Éxitos Románticos. (2005) Fonovisa
 Greatest Hits/Con Grupo Aroma [CD+DVD]. (2005) Fonovisa
 Encuentro De Angeles Volumen 02/Con Los Angeles Azules. (2006)Disa/Fonovisa
 Encuentro Sonidero/Con Grupo Aroma. (2006) Fonovisa
 Para Ti Nuestra Historia [2CDS+Entrevistas]. (2006) Fonovisa
 La Mejor Coleccion (30 Super Exitos) [2CD]. (2007) Fonovisa
 15 Autenticos Exitos. (2008) Fonovisa.
 Las Número 1.(2008)Fonovisa/Univision Records
 Oro Grupero/Con Los Angeles Azules. (2008)UMG Records/Universal Music Distribution. (Only Available On USA).
 Mi Coleccion. (2012). Fonovisa.
 20 Kilates. (2014)Fonovisa/Univision Records
 Gran Encuentro (20 Éxitos Originales)/(con Los Ángeles Azules).(2014) UMG Records/Universal Music Distribution. (Only Available On USA).
 Amor De Telenovela (Baile Total). (2017) UMG Records/Universal Music Distribution. (Only available on Digital Download)
 Lo Mas Escuchado De.. (2019) UMG Records/Universal Music Distribution. (Only available on Digital Download)
 Lo Mas Romantico De..  (2021) UMG Records/Universal Music Distribution. (Only available on Digital Download)
 Cumbias De Verano Best Hits. (2021) UMG Records/Universal Music Distribution. (Only available on Digital Download)
 Ayer, Hoy y Siempre. (2021) UMG Records/Universal Music Distribution. (Only available on Digital Download)
 Cumbias Para Bailar. (2021) UMG Records/Universal Music Distribution. (Only available on Digital Download)
 Favoritas Con Amor. (2022)   UMG Records/Universal Music Distribution. (Only available on Digital Download)

Official Video Clips
 Me Vas A Recordar (1999)
 Amor Secreto (1999)
Mentiras (1999)
Un sueño (2000)
 Toda (2000)
 Me Volvi A Acordar De Ti (2001)
 Que levante la mano (2001)
 Por Un Minuto De Tu Amor (2002)
 !Y Qué! (2004)
 Cuando te enamoras (Univision music group (2005)
Ya me enteré (2020) Gerencia 360

References

External links
 Los Angeles de Charly at Fonovisa

Cumbia musical groups
Mexican musical groups
Musical groups established in 1999
1999 establishments in Mexico